"Shining Star" is a song by Australian rock band INXS, released as the only single issued from the band's first live album, Live Baby Live (1991), on 21 October 1991. It is the one new studio track recorded for the album. Upon the song's release, it peaked at  21 on the Australian ARIA Singles Chart, No. 27 on the UK Singles Chart, becoming the group's ninth top-40 single in the latter country. In the United States, it peaked at No. 4 on the Billboard Modern Rock Tracks chart and No. 14 on the Album Rock Tracks chart.

Guest vocalists
The studio recording featured backing vocals by Keith Urban and Stuart McKie. Urban was yet to release his own first album, and was not yet well known to the public, but was invited to the studio by Kirk Pengilly to join in the recording.

B-sides
Four live tracks were released as B-sides: "I Send a Message" (from Wembley, London 1991), "Faith in Each Other" (from London or Sydney 1990), and "Bitter Tears" (from Paris). The fourth track, "The Loved One" (from Wembley, London 1991), was released in Australia in all formats instead of "Faith in Each Other". All these tracks were only available on the single.

Track listings

 Australian version
 "Shining Star" – 3:51
 "I Send a Message" (live) – 4:01
 "Bitter Tears" (live) – 3:55
 "The Loved One" (live) – 4:55

 UK version and US 12-inch single
 "Shining Star" (live EP version) – 3:52
 "I Send a Message" (live) – 3:26
 "Faith in Each Other" (live) – 4:40
 "Bitter Tears" (live) – 3:47

 US and Canadian cassette single
 "Shining Star"
 "Faith in Each Other" (live)
 "Bitter Tears" (live)

 Japanese mini-CD single
 "Shining Star"
 "Bitter Tears" (live)

Charts

References

1991 singles
1991 songs
Atlantic Records singles
East West Records singles
Mercury Records singles
Song recordings produced by Mark Opitz
Songs written by Andrew Farriss
Songs written by Michael Hutchence